Daviesia horrida, commonly known as prickly bitter-pea, is a species of flowering plant in the family Fabaceae and is endemic to the south-west of Western Australia. It is a spreading shrub with rigid, spiny branchlets, narrowly elliptic phyllodes and orange and dark red flowers.

Description

Taxonomy
Daviesia horrida was first formally described by Swiss botanist Carl Meissner in Johann Georg Christian Lehmann's  Plantae Preissianae in 1844, from an unpublished description by Balthazar Preiss. The specific epithet (horrida) means "bristly or prickly".

Distribution and habitat
Prickly bitter-pea grows in the shrubby understorey of forest in hilly terrain between Bindoon, Busselton and the Pallinup River in the Esperance Plains, Jarrah Forest, Swan Coastal Plain and Warren biogeographic regions of south-western Western Australia.<ref name="ASB" /

References

horrida
Rosids of Western Australia
Plants described in 1844
Taxa named by Carl Meissner